Mikkonen is a Finnish surname. Notable people with the surname include:

Hanna Grobler (born Mikkonen in 1981), Finnish high jumper
Jenni Honkanen-Mikkonen (born 1980), Finnish sprint canoer, wife of Kalle 
Juho Mikkonen (born 1990), Finnish cross-country skier
Kalle Mikkonen (born 1976), Finnish sprint canoer 
Marja Mikkonen (born 1979), Finnish artist and filmmaker
Paavo Mikkonen (born 1942), Finnish sports shooter
Suvi Mikkonen (born 1988), Finnish taekwondo practitioner

Finnish-language surnames